William Blaine Luetkemeyer (born May 7, 1952) is an American politician serving as the U.S. representative for , a seat he has held since 2009. A member of the Republican Party, Luetkemeyer formerly served as a member of the Missouri House of Representatives.

Early life and education
Luetkemeyer was born in Jefferson City on May 7, 1952. He attended Lincoln University and graduated with a Bachelor of Arts degree in political science with a minor in business administration.

Career 
A lifelong farmer, Luetkemeyer has also owned several small businesses, as well as running a bank and serving as an insurance agent. He also served on the board of trustees for the village of St. Elizabeth, near Osage Beach.

Missouri state politics
In 1998, Luetkemeyer was elected to the Missouri House of Representatives from the 115th Legislative District. As a state representative, Luetkemeyer chaired the Financial Services Committee and the House Republican Caucus and co-sponsored a statewide constitutional amendment defining marriage as being between a man and a woman, which was approved by 71% of Missouri voters in 2004. He also worked on legislation to allow Missourians to carry concealed firearms, ban partial-birth abortions, and reform worker compensation laws. He also supported deregulation of the financial industry—specifically the lending industry.

In 2004, Luetkemeyer did not seek reelection but instead was one of seven Republicans who ran for state treasurer. He finished second in the Republican primary, losing to Sarah Steelman, who won the general election.

In 2005, Governor Matt Blunt appointed Luetkemeyer Missouri Tourism Director, a post he held until he ran for the U.S. House of Representatives in 2008. One of his projects was working with Blunt and Lt. Governor Peter Kinder to start the Tour of Missouri, a cycling event modeled on the Tour de France.

U.S. House of Representatives
Luetkemeyer's district, currently the 3rd, was numbered as the 9th from 2009 to 2013. It contains most of east-central Missouri, including Jefferson City and some of the southern and northern St. Louis suburbs and exurbs.

Elections

2008

Luetkemeyer became a candidate for the open seat in the 9th Congressional District after incumbent Kenny Hulshof’s resignation in his unsuccessful bid for governor. Luetkemeyer won the Republican primary with 39.7% of the vote against state representatives Bob Onder and Danie Moore, as well as Brock Olivo and Dan Bishir. Luetkemeyer narrowly won the general election.

2010

Luetkemeyer defeated Charles Baker in the Republican primary. He faced token third-party opposition as the Democratic Party did not field a candidate for the district's seat. In the general election he received 77% of the vote.

2012

Missouri was reduced to eight districts after the 2010 U.S. Census determined that the state's population growth was slower than the national average. Luetkemeyer's district was renumbered the 3rd Congressional District. It lost most of its northern portion to the newly drawn 6th Congressional District. To make up for the loss of population, it was pushed slightly to the west, gaining all of Jefferson City. Luetkemeyer already represented the share of the capital in Callaway County, but picked up Cole County in the redistricting process.

Luetkemeyer easily won the general election in his first run in the newly created district, with 63% of the vote.

2014

In the August primary, Luetkemeyer defeated two rivals with almost 80% of the vote. He won the general election with 68% of the vote.

2016

2018

2020

Tenure
On October 23, 2013, Luetkemeyer introduced H.R. 3329; 113th Congress to enhance the ability of community financial institutions to foster economic growth and serve their communities, boost small businesses, and increase individual savings. The bill would direct the Federal Reserve to revise certain regulations related to small bank holding companies (BHCs). Current regulations allow BHCs with assets of less than $500 million that satisfy other tests to incur higher amounts of debt than larger institutions in order to acquire other banks. H.R. 3329 would apply the less stringent standard to more BHCs by raising the asset limit to $1 billion and allow savings and loan holding companies to qualify.

On June 26, 2014, Luetkemeyer introduced H.R.4986, which would end the controversial Operation Choke Point, which was designed to limit the activities of money launderers but had come under criticism for alleged abuse. On November 20, 2014, in a further effort to end Operation Choke Point, he introduced additional legislation that would require federal banking agencies to put in writing any suggestion or order to terminate a customer's banking account.

In December 2020, Luetkemeyer was one of 126 Republican members of the House of Representatives to sign an amicus brief in support of Texas v. Pennsylvania, a lawsuit filed at the United States Supreme Court contesting the results of the 2020 presidential election, in which Joe Biden defeated incumbent Donald Trump. The Supreme Court declined to hear the case on the basis that Texas lacked standing under Article III of the Constitution to challenge the results of an election held by another state.

In October 2022, Politico reported that Luetkemeyer criticized some US-based financial executives attending the Global Financial Leaders' Investment Summit, saying that "American executives attending an event with the CCP's so-called enforcer makes a person question whether human rights are a real concern," in reference to Chief Executive John Lee.

Committee assignments
Committee on Financial Services
Subcommittee on Financial Institutions and Consumer Credit
Select Subcommittee on the Coronavirus Crisis

Caucus memberships
Republican Study Committee
 Congressional Constitution Caucus 
Congressional Western Caucus

Personal life
Luetkemeyer has been married to his wife Jackie since 1976. They have three children and six grandchildren. He is a member of the Knights of Columbus, the Eldon Chamber of Commerce, the Farm Bureau, and the National Rifle Association. He attends St. Lawrence Catholic Church.

Electoral history

See also 

 ATM Industry Association (ATMIA)
 Operation Choke Point

References

External links

Congressman Blaine Luetkemeyer official U.S. House website
Blaine Luetkemeyer for Congress 

 
 
Track Blane Luetkemeyer at TrackTheGOP.com

|-

|-

|-

1952 births
20th-century American politicians
21st-century American politicians
American Roman Catholics
Catholics from Missouri
Lincoln University (Missouri) alumni
Living people
Republican Party members of the Missouri House of Representatives
People from Jefferson City, Missouri
People from Miller County, Missouri
Republican Party members of the United States House of Representatives from Missouri
Tea Party movement activists